Varinder Kumar Aggarwal  (born 1961) is a British organic chemist specialising in asymmetric synthesis. He is a Professor of Synthetic Chemistry at the School of Chemistry of the University of Bristol.

Early life 
Aggarwal was born in 1961 in Kalianpur, a town in Northern India. In 1963 his family emigrated to the United Kingdom. He was one of six sons, and grew up in Scotland, then Nottingham, England.

Education and career 
Aggarwal earned his PhD from the University of Cambridge in 1986 under the supervision of Stuart Warren. His thesis was entitled Stereocontrolled synthesis with phenylthio migration. He carried out postdoctoral work with Gilbert Stork at Columbia University, before taking up appointments first in Bath, then Sheffield and finally at the University of Bristol where he is currently a professor.

Research 
Aggarwal developed new methods of using chemical reactions to assemble complex, biologically important molecules. His research includes new ways of speeding up, or catalysing, these processes of synthesis. His work has applications in medicine, such as helping to provide a more effective vaccine against tuberculosis.

Although many organic molecules can occur in "right-handed" and "left-handed" forms, invariably just one of these is seen in living organisms. Normal chemical reactions, however, make both forms in equal amounts. Aggarwal's work on asymmetric synthesis made it possible to selectively synthesise more of the form important to understanding biological processes.

Aggarwal specialises in a type of molecule called ylides, which are important to the Wittig reaction – a standard tool in organic chemistry.

Awards and honours 
Aggarwal is the winner of multiple awards, including the Corday-Morgan and Organic Stereochemistry awards of the Royal Society of Chemistry. He was elected a Fellow of the Royal Society (FRS) in 2012. His certificate of election reads: 

2019: Awarded the Davy Medal of the Royal Society.

References 

Living people
Organic chemists
21st-century British chemists
1961 births
Fellows of the Royal Society
Academics of the University of Bristol
Alumni of the University of Cambridge
Indian emigrants to the United Kingdom
Fellows of the Royal Society of Chemistry